Allen Craig Eiland (born April 4, 1962) is a Democratic former member and Speaker pro Tempore of the Texas House of Representatives. From 2003 until 2015, Eiland represented Texas House District 23, which includes Galveston, Jamaica Beach, Texas City, and the Bolivar Peninsula in Galveston County and all of Chambers County.

Prior to redistricting in 2003, Eiland was the member for House District 24, which roughly covered all of Galveston County west of Interstate 45.

Eiland was first elected to the House in 1994. For eight years he served on the Insurance and Appropriations committees, including four years as Vice Chair of the Insurance Committee and two years as chair of the House Pensions and Investments Committee.

In 2009, Speaker Joe Straus named Eiland the House Speaker Pro-tempore, a job which entails leading the house in Speaker Straus' absence. Eiland was also named to the powerful House Appropriations committee and the Insurance committee.  In 2011 Beverly Woolley of Houston was chosen to replace Eiland after Republicans captured a super majority of seats (101 out of 150) in the 2010 elections.

He is viewed by his colleagues as an expert on insurance matters and the state budget in general and the Medicaid and CHIP program budgets specifically. Texas Monthly magazine has also named Eiland one of Texas' 10 Best Lawmakers.

In the November 4, 2014, general election, Eiland did not seek reelection.

Eiland served on the House Appropriations Committee and was the vice chairman of the Insurance Committee.

A native of Stanton in Martin County, Eiland resides on Galveston Island. He and his wife, the former Melissa Orebaugh, have four children (William Gray Eiland, Delaney Eiland, Blake Eiland, and Robert Tucker Eiland). They are members of Moody Memorial First United Methodist Church in Galveston.

References

External links
 Representative Craig Eiland official Texas House of Representatives site
 

1962 births
Living people
People from Stanton, Texas
People from Galveston, Texas
Baylor Bears football players
Democratic Party members of the Texas House of Representatives
21st-century American politicians
Texas lawyers
20th-century American lawyers
20th-century American politicians